Hamzalı is a village in the Orhangazi district of Bursa Province in Turkey.

References

Villages in Orhangazi District